In molecular biology, glycoside hydrolase family 85 is a family of glycoside hydrolases.

Glycoside hydrolases  are a widespread group of enzymes that hydrolyse the glycosidic bond between two or more carbohydrates, or between a carbohydrate and a non-carbohydrate moiety. A classification system for glycoside hydrolases, based on sequence similarity, has led to the definition of >100 different families. This classification is available on the CAZy web site, and also discussed at CAZypedia, an online encyclopedia of carbohydrate active enzymes.

Glycoside hydrolase family 85 enzymes have endo-beta-N-acetylglucosaminidase activity  (CAZY GH_85). These enzymes work on a broad spectrum of substrates.

References 

EC 3.2.1
GH family
Protein families